Jallikattu is a 2019 Indian Malayalam-language independent action thriller film directed by Lijo Jose Pellissery with a screenplay by S. Hareesh and R. Jayakumar, based on the short story Maoist by Hareesh. The film stars Antony Varghese, Chemban Vinod Jose, Sabumon Abdusamad and Santhy Balachandran. The plot follows a bull that escapes from a slaughterhouse in a hilly remote village and the entire village men gathering to hunt down the animal.

Jallikattu was premiered on 6 September 2019 at the 2019 Toronto International Film Festival and received widespread critical acclaim. The film was showcased at the 24th Busan International Film Festival under the section 'A Window on Asian Cinema'. It was released in the home state Kerala on 4 October 2019. Lijo Jose Pellissery received the Silver Peacock-Best Director trophy at the 50th International Film Festival of India. It was selected as the Indian entry for the Best International Feature Film at the 93rd Academy Awards, but it was not nominated. It was third Malayalam film after Guru and Adaminte Makan Abu to be chosen as India's official entry to the Oscars. It was included in The Hindu's top 25 Malayalam films of the decade and is widely regarded as one of the defining movies of the New Wave Movement.

Plot 
Kalan Varkey is a butcher in a small, rural village in Kerala, who along with his assistant Antony, meet before dawn each day to slaughter a buffalo and prepare its meat for sale in the market. One morning, a buffalo slips its bindings before Varkey can kill it, escaping into the hilly forest. Soon after, a large haystack is set ablaze, and the entire village wakes up to put out the fire. The men of the village, hearing of the buffalo's escape and believing that it was responsible, begin an urgent hunt for the animal.

As the day progresses, the villagers repeatedly try, but fail to corner the buffalo and kill it. Crops at the rubber plantation are trampled, a drinks vendor's cart is smashed, along with the village's bank and convenience store is both destroyed. The villagers begin to turn on Varkey, blaming him for the vandalism caused by the bull. Meanwhile, the police turn up but refuse to help, as killing cattle is illegal - instead, they focus on merely warning people to stay inside until the buffalo is caught. The frustrated villagers instead call Kuttachan, a renowned local poacher with his own hunting rifle, for help. Antony is unhappy to see Kuttachan back in the village; in a flashback it is revealed that, before Antony married his wife Sophie, the two men had been rivals over her. Antony had won by informing the police that Kuttachan was stealing sandalwood from the local church, leading to his arrest. As Kuttachan prepares for the hunt by chopping up a metal bucket handle into pieces of buckshot, they start a mass argument among the villagers over which man deserves to land the killing blow on the buffalo.

Elsewhere in the village, the disruption - both from the buffalo's rampage and the hunt - spreads further, causing other personal issues to come to the surface. Law and order begins to break down, with some of the men setting off fireworks and committing random acts of vandalism. Kuriachan, a wealthy man who had been planning an elaborate feast of different buffalo dishes for his daughter's wedding party, ventures out to try and find some chicken instead; a group of workers seize him, stripping him and bring him to the hunt as a trophy. Meanwhile, Kuriachan's daughter tries to avoid the arranged marriage by running away - but a neighbour catches and punishes her. Several of the men, enraged and frustrated, beat their wives or drink heavily, while some women find men openly leering at them through windows as they sleep.

After night falls, the buffalo is found lying at the bottom of a well; Antony immediately decided to take the credit, claiming that chasing the buffalo down into the well had been his plan all along. Kuttachan wants to shoot the buffalo there and then, but Antony demands that they bring it back to the surface first so he and Varkey can still butcher it properly and sell the meat. By contrast, Varkey is indifferent, and he takes a nap under a nearby tree as the other men argue and plan. The men construct a scaffold, and lower Antony down so he can attach ropes around the buffalo's legs and neck. However, it begins raining heavily; the ropes slip off as soon as the buffalo reaches the top, and as it thrashes around one of the villagers is thrown down the well and killed. The buffalo escapes again into the forest. Kuttachan and the other villagers blame Antony for the man's death. Meanwhile, another group of men, furious that a cop is still refusing to help, set his car on fire.

By this point the villagers are desperate and frantic. In-fighting leads to them splintering into smaller groups, each with its own plan - and with each man desperate to be the one to finally kill the bull. As the men string up ropes, chains, and nets around the perimeter of the village, forcing the buffalo into a smaller and smaller area, the situation becomes increasingly chaotic and confused. Antony and Kuttachan stumble across each other in a clearing in the dark forest, and begin fighting; Kuttachan is about to kill Antony, but the buffalo suddenly emerges from the undergrowth and disrupts the fight. Kuttachan catches the buffalo by its horns and asks Antony to hold its legs. But Antony uses this opportunity to stab Kuttachan multiple times and fatally wounds him. The buffalo escapes. Antony and the villagers chase the buffalo towards the river and across a bridge, where the animal becomes stuck in deep mud.

Antony stabs the buffalo, and screams that he was the one who deserves the credit for killing it. This kicks off a desperate pile-on, as dozens of men, holding lit torches and bearing crude weapons, jump on top of each other, stabbing both the animal and each other as they form a huge, writhing mass of human bodies. The final shot is of a group of prehistoric men, wearing loincloths and carrying spears, racing each other through the dark while hunting a buffalo.

Cast 
 Antony Varghese as Antony
 Chemban Vinod Jose as Kalan Varkey
 Sabumon Abdusamad as Kuttachan
 Jaffar Idukki as Kuriachan
 Santhy Balachandran as Sophie
 Tinu Pappachan as Sub Inspector of Police
 Thomman Kunju as Planter Patrose
 Rajkumar as Bangladeshi Bhai
 Prasanth as Sunny
 Soniya as Omana

Music
The film score was produced by Prashant Pillai.

Release

Theatrical 
The official trailer of the film was unveiled by Friday Film House on 28 September 2019. Jallikattu was premiered at Toronto International Film Festival 2019. It was theatrically released on 4 October 2019 in Kerala.

Home media 

Jallikattu was released on streaming service Amazon Prime Video on 4 February 2020. A Telugu dubbed version with same title was released on Aha.

Reception

Critical response 

 Reviewing the movie for Onmanorama, Sajesh Mohan wrote: "After Ee. Ma. Yau, Lijo Jose Pellissery has again opted to saunter through the innate nature of humans in an off-kilter manner." According to the reviewer, 'the movie's technical brilliance is something that Mollywood can flaunt for a long time to come.'

Box office
The film grossed ₹7.3 crores in its first week run in Kerala and became commercial success.

Awards and nominations

See also 
 List of submissions to the 93rd Academy Awards for Best International Feature Film
 List of Indian submissions for the Academy Award for Best International Feature Film

References

External links 
 

2019 films
Bullfighting films
Films based on short fiction
Films set in Kerala
Indian action films
Jallikattu